Fox Point is a community in the Canadian province of Nova Scotia, located on the Aspotogan Peninsula in the Chester Municipal District on the Lighthouse Route (Nova Scotia Route 329).

History 

The Mi'kmaq from Shubenacadie used to settle here in the summer and migrate back in land to Shubenacadie in the winter months.  There is an image of Susan Sack, Harry Piers, and Henry Sack on Indian Point (1935).  Birch-bark summer 'camp' or wigwam of Micmac Indian, Henry Sack (son of Isaac Sack, leader of the Mi’kmaq at Shubenacadie) and his wife Susan (in typical old Micmac woman's costume) on Indian Point, Fox Point Road, near Hubbards, Lun. Co., N.S. Left to right: Susan Sack, Harry Piers of Halifax, and Henry Sack of Indian reservation, Truro, N.S. View looking northeast...Carrying basket made by Henry Sack, [NS] Museum acc. no. 8305."

The first known settler at Fox Point was Joseph Coolen (Coulen).  He was a Newfoundland Irish.   He had ten children in Fox Point and the first child born 1805.

John Dorey and his wife Susan (Conrad) were also earlier settlers of Fox Point.  George Dorey also settled here (1815). Dorey is a French speaking foreign protestant.

After the War of 1812, William Francis Shatford settled in Fox Point.  During the war William  was in the British Navy fighting against the United States.  He served on HMS Java.  William was in the battle between HMS Java and USS Constitution. After Java was defeated, William was imprisoned in a prisoner-of-war camp in Virginia.  Upon his release from prison after the war, William settled in Fox Point. (There is some evidence that the story of William being on the Java is false. The historical records indicate that the prisoners taken by USS Constitution were taken to Brazil where they were paroled and sent to England. Hence the story of William being imprisoned in Virginia and released after the war may be inaccurate.)

Letter from National Archives, Washington DC, 10 May 1999

This is in reply to your letter about William Francis and Samuel Edward Shatford.

We examined the register of British prisoners of war in the United States, 1812-1815, but we did not locate anyone with the surname Shatford. This register included the names of prisoners captured on the British ship Java and many other captured ships. According to the register, the prisoners from Java were released to the Consul at Bahia, Brazil, on January 4, 1813.

We also examined the US Navy Subject File 1775-1910, for the category "RB" (British Prisoners). This file included information about prisoners captured by USS Constitution and prisoners from Java. We did not locate the surname Shatford in these records.

Sincerely

Rebecca A Livingston
Old Military and Civil Records
Textual Archives Services Division

William Shatford’s son settled in Hubbards, Nova Scotia in 1860.  William’s grandson J.D. Shatford became a successful businessman and left the community a 1.4 million dollar trust fund to promote education.

Twenty years later in 1832, Patrick Noonan took possession of the land.    The heritage of Patrick Noonan is unknown, probably Newfoundland Irish. There is a lake in the community named Noonan Lake, which is likely named after Patrick.

This community is likely named after Charles James Fox (1749–1806), prominent British politician whose career lasted 38 years.  Among other things, he is remembered for working tirelessly to abolish slavery.

References

External links
 Fox Point on Destination Nova Scotia

Communities in Lunenburg County, Nova Scotia
General Service Areas in Nova Scotia